John Tricker Conquest (1789 – 24 October 1866) was a British accoucheur (male-midwife) and physician who wrote an influential textbook on midwifery Outlines of Midwifery (1820) which went into several editions and was translated into many languages and promoted in colonial India.

Conquest studied medicine at Edinburgh (MD, 1813) and was admitted LRCP in 1819. He worked as a midwife and later offered courses at his home in Aldemanbury Postern, charging 3 guineas a student. Still later moved to Finsbury Square and worked for a while as a midwifery lecturer at St. Bartholomew's Hospital but a conversion to homeopathy in 1834 led to his being asked to leave work. He also worked as physician at the City Lying-in hospital, London Female Penitentiary, the London Orphan Asylum, the Stoke Newington and Stamford Hill Dispensary.

Many physicians considered him indecent and his style of writing sickly and he did not become a Fellow of the Royal College of Physicians. After retirement, he died senile at his home on Shooter's Hill. Translations of his book were made into several languages including German, Urdu, Telugu, Tamil, and Kannada through Surgeon Edward Green Balfour in 1874.

References

External links 
 Royal College of Physicians
 Outlines of Midwifery (1820) (1831, 5th edition) (Urdu translation, 1852) (German translation, 1834)
 Letters to a Mother on the Management of Herself and her Children in Health and Disease (1850, 3rd edition)
 What is Homoeopathy?: And is There Any, and what Amount Of, Truth in It? (1859)
 Tricker's talk at the Hunterian Society, February 11, 1830 on Puerperal Infection

1789 births
1866 deaths
British gynaecologists